Sweden first competed at the Paralympic Games in 1960, at the 1960 Summer Paralympics. Sweden first won a medal at the Paralympics in 1964, at the Summer Games in Tokyo, Japan.

Sweden was also the host country of the inaugural Winter Paralympic Games, in 1976 in Örnsköldsvik.

Medals

Medals by Summer Games

Medals by Winter Games

Medals by Summer Sport
Source:

See also
 Sweden at the Olympics

References